The 1969 Dixie 500 was a NASCAR Grand National Series event that was held on August 10, 1969, at Atlanta International Raceway in Hampton, Georgia.

Background
Atlanta International Raceway (now Atlanta Motor Speedway) is one of ten current intermediate tracks to hold NASCAR races; the others are Charlotte Motor Speedway, Chicagoland Speedway, Darlington Raceway, Homestead Miami Speedway, Kansas Speedway, Kentucky Speedway, Las Vegas Motor Speedway, New Hampshire Motor Speedway, and Texas Motor Speedway. However, at the time, only Charlotte and Darlington were built.

The track's turns are banked at twenty-four degrees, while the front stretch, the location of the finish line, and the back stretch are banked at five.

The race was scheduled for August 3, 1969, but it ended up being rain delayed until August 10, 1969.

Race report
After 334 laps (3¾ hours of racing), LeeRoy Yarbrough defeated David Pearson by 5½ seconds in front of 14,300 people. John Sears had a problem with his engine and had to withdraw from the race on the third lap. All 40 competitors on the racing grid were born in the United States of America. Nord Krauskopf's entry (with Bobby Isaac as the driver) finished in 34th place. 

Ford vehicles dominated the starting grid. The winner of the race received $18,620 of the total winners ($ when considering inflation) while the last-place finisher went home with $725 ($ when considering inflation).

This was the last race for Smokey Yunick's team. Charlie Glotzbach brought the #13 Yunick Ford home in 4th place. The transition to purpose-built racecars began in the early 1960s and occurred gradually over that decade.  Changes made to the sport by the late 1960s brought an end to the "strictly stock" vehicles of the 1950s.

Notable crew chiefs included Cotton Owens, Jim Vandiver, Dale Inman, Harry Hyde and Dick Hutcherson.

Qualifying

Failed to qualify:  Earl Brooks (#26), Roy Tyner (#9), John Sears (#4), Ron Grana (#05), Kenneth Cline (#69)

Top 10 finishers

Timeline
Section reference: 
 Start of race: Cale Yarborough had the pole position as the race officially commenced.
 Lap 3: John Sears managed to wreck his engine while racing at high speeds.
 Lap 28: Problems with his vehicle's clutch eliminated Don Tarr from the race.
 Lap 46: Bill Seifert managed to wreck his engine while racing at high speeds.
 Lap 50: Buddy Baker took over the lead from Cale Yarborough.
 Lap 53: Richard Petty took over the lead from Buddy Baker.
 Lap 55: Bobby Allison took over the lead from Richard Petty.
 Lap 56: Paul Goldsmith took over the lead from Bobby Allison.
 Lap 57: Cale Yarborough took over the lead from Paul Goldsmith.
 Lap 62: Ed Negre managed to wreck his engine while racing at high speeds.
 Lap 70: Charlie Glotzbach took over the lead from Cale Yarborough.
 Lap 73: Cale Yarborough took over the lead from Charlie Glotzbach.
 Lap 78: Dub Simpson managed to wreck his engine while racing at high speeds.
 Lap 82: Earl Brooks managed to wreck his engine while racing at high speeds.
 Lap 83: G.C. Spencer managed to wreck his engine while racing at high speeds.
 Lap 93: Bobby Isaac managed to wreck his engine while racing at high speeds.
 Lap 94: Buddy Baker took over the lead from Cale Yarborough.
 Lap 97: Cale Yarborough took over the lead from Buddy Baker.
 Lap 107: Hoss Ellington had a terminal crash.
 Lap 111: David Pearson took over the lead from Cale Yarborough.
 Lap 123: Charlie Glotzbach took over the lead from David Pearson.
 Lap 125: David Pearson took over the lead from Charlie Glotzbach.
 Lap 133: Dave Miller managed to wreck his engine while racing at high speeds.
 Lap 168: LeeRoy Yarbrough took over the lead from David Pearson.
 Lap 171: Richard Petty took over the lead from LeeRoy Yarbrough.
 Lap 182: LeeRoy Yarbrough took over the lead from Richard Petty.
 Lap 187: The sway bar on Wayne Gillette's vehicle became too much of a danger, forcing Gillette off the track.
 Lap 192: Elmo Langley managed to overheat his vehicle.
 Lap 207: Frank Warren managed to wreck his engine while racing at high speeds.
 Lap 240: Richard Petty took over the lead from LeeRoy Yarbrough.
 Lap 242: LeeRoy Yarbrough took over the lead from Richard Petty.
 Lap 244: Henley Gray ruined his vehicle's driveshaft.
 Lap 264: J.D. McDuffie managed to wreck his engine while racing at high speeds; Buddy Young damaged his vehicle's water pump beyond repair.
 Lap 291: David Pearson took over the lead from LeeRoy Yarbrough.
 Lap 293: Richard Petty took over the lead from David Pearson.
 Lap 303: LeeRoy Yarbrough took over the lead from Richard Petty.
 Finish: LeeRoy Yarbrough was officially declared the winner of the race.

References

Dixie 500
Dixie 500
NASCAR races at Atlanta Motor Speedway